Cara Jones (born Joan Cara Stein in 1964) is an American singer, songwriter, and a voice actor. Married name is Joan Dans.

Career
As a singer and songwriter, she has sold over 1.2 million physical copies of her songs in Japan. In the United States and elsewhere, her music can be heard on the popular syndicated television series Dawson's Creek, as well as a number of feature films.

As a voice talent, Cara is heard worldwide as the English voice of the GPS car navigation systems of the Jaguar (car), models of the Cadillac, Mercedes-Benz, Land Rover, Ford and more. She announced the 1998 Winter Olympics at Nagano, voiced hundreds of commercials, as well as popular PlayStation and Sega games. In addition, Cara spent 7 years as a prime time DJ on Tokyo's popular FM station, J-Wave. Also helmed radio shows at FM Yokohama, Bay FM (Japan), CBC Radio (Nagoya) Chubu-Nippon Broadcasting.

Personal life
She has one child, born in 2007, and one husband.

Voice talent

Games

 Shenmue: Hisaka Sawano, Mayumi Mishima, Lidia Bennett
 Tekken 3: Julia Chang (1998 game)
 Einhänder: Hyperion's Computer Voice
 Arc the Lad II: Shante's Singing Voice
 Fighting Vipers: Jane

Other

 Cara Jones announced the medalists of all outdoor events at the 1998 Winter Olympics at Nagano.
 Cara Jones was the US English voice of the Denso GPS car navigation system of models of the Jaguar, Land Rover, Cadillac, and Mercedes Benz.
 DJ at J-Wave 81.3 FM in Tokyo on programs "Tokio Cold Cuts", "The Essential Love Collection", "Optune Midnight Faces", “Behind the Hits”
 Got start in radio at WHRB at Harvard University. Hosted "Folkways" show.
 Cara Jones voiced commercials or industrials for PNC, Pampers, Sony, Xerox, Mazda, Mitsubishi, Agnes B., Shick, Toyota, Phillip Morris, Japan Air Lines, Harry Winston, Volvo, Canon, Deutsche Telecom, Ansett Australia Airlines, Kirin Beer, Toshiba EMI, Coca-Cola, Tokyo Electric Power Co, Land Rover, Komatsu, Shiseido, Suntory, NHK, Panasonic, Paralympics, ANA Airlines, Hustler Casino, BBQs Galore, Planet Fitness, Time Warner.
 Chage and Aska: Narrator on album "Yin & Yang".
 Cara Jones wrote and co-hosted a weekly radio program with Barry White.
 Cara Jones is known for radio interviews with Harry Connick Jr.; The Manhattan Transfer; Charlie Watts; Shaggy (musician); David Sanborn; Karla Bonoff; Suzanne Vega; Shawn Colvin; Mary Chapin Carpenter; Jellyfish.
 Cara Jones wrote the liner notes to the Japanese release of Fat City by Shawn Colvin.
 Cara Jones was asked to write original English lyrics to the classic Japanese song Miagete Goran Yoru no Hoshi o by Rokusuke Ei and composer Taku Izumi. Her version was recorded by Jazz singer Harumi Kaneko and R&B singer Melodie Sexton.
 Cara Jones wrote the lyrics for English-language versions of hits by Japanese rock band The Yellow Monkey, including "Bulb" and "Sugar Fix" (reached No. 18 on Oricon chart).
 Cara Jones sang the song "You Are My Sky" from "Pandora's Box" at the wedding of actress and singer Yū Hayami.
 Cara Jones is a Multilingual voiceover producer at Carasmatic Productions (www.carasmatic.com).

Singer-songwriter

TV – Film – Games
 Dawsons Creek: The song "Spit It Out" was featured in episode No. 511 "Something Wild"
 Arc the Lad II:  The singing voice of Shante on "Musicman"; lyricist on "Musicman"
 Legend of Heroes IV:  Vocals and lyrics on "One Bead of Scarlet"
 Tobe Pegasus!:  Lyrics on "The Simple Things"
 Girl Play (2004 Feature Film): Original music, "Whisper Love" (music, lyrics, vocals)
 Give or Take an Inch (2003 Short Film): Original music
 Sugar Sweet (2001 Feature Film): Original music

Discography

Solo albums

Other Artists (highlights)

References

External links 

 Music Website: www.carajones.com
 Voiceover Website
 
 Cara Jones on Musical Discoveries
 iTunes
 Spotify
 BandCamp

1964 births
20th-century American actresses
20th-century American singers
20th-century American women singers
21st-century American actresses
21st-century American singers
21st-century American women singers
American street performers
American video game actresses
American voice actresses
American women pop singers
American women singer-songwriters
Living people
Place of birth missing (living people)